The Austin K2/Y is a British heavy military ambulance that was used by all Commonwealth services during the Second World War. 

Built by Austin, it was based on the 1938 Austin K30 30-cwt light truck which as the K2 chassis was built during the war for many uses.

Design 
The K2/Y could take ten casualties sitting or four stretcher cases. The rear body, known as No. 2 Mk I/L was developed by the Royal Army Medical Corps and built by coachbuilder Mann Egerton. Simple canvas closures were used in place of driver's cab doors.

The interior dimensions were approximately 2.6 metres long, 2.0 metres wide and 1.7 metres high. At the rear of the vehicle there were two large doors. From the driver's cab the wounded could also be accessed through a small internal door with a seat. The exterior was mainly made from painted canvas.

The Austin K2/Y was generally regarded as having a widely spaced four-speed gearbox that needed to be "understood", but once mastered provided good service. It had two petrol tanks, one on each side (total capacity: approx. 2×12 Imperial gallons (2×54.5 L)).

A total of 13,102 Austin K2/Y ambulances (the front mudguards ended at the 'doors') were built at the company's Longbridge plant almost continuously from 1940 until the war ended. An estimated 50 or more remain today. The Austin chassis was one of three main designs fitted with Mann Egerton bodies, the others being Morris Commercial CS11/30F (the front mudguards ended underneath the rungs) and Bedford ML 54 (the front mudguards ended before the 'doors'). It is estimated there are two remaining Morris Commercials, but no Bedford examples are said to survive.

Service 
One veteran of the North African Campaign stated he once managed to carry 27 wounded, with passengers seated on the wings, bonnet, rear steps, and in extra stretchers suspended by rifles across the rear walkway; he was mentioned in dispatches for this feat.

The then Princess Elizabeth was trained to drive one during the war.

The design was popular with British and Commonwealth troops, as well as American forces which received them in reverse Lend-Lease. The K2 (KTwo) was often affectionately nicknamed "Katy", also by British and US troopers in occupied Germany of the 1950s.

The K2/Y ambulance was also used in the Korean War.

Variants 
There were two versions of this ambulance: The early version had two round rotary ventilators on the roof and a spare wheel cover with a large hump. The late version had two square fixed vents on the roof and a spare-wheel cover with a much smaller and rounder hump. The spare wheel was moved further into the body to stop drivers hitting the cover (and wheel) when passing other vehicles. The later version also had a larger cut-out in the internal door.

In media 
A K2/Y had a central role in the 1958 film Ice Cold in Alex (a WW II drama) featuring John Mills, Sylvia Syms, Anthony Quayle and Harry Andrews. The film is based on the novel of the same name (1957) by British author Christopher Landon.  However, the vehicle used in that film was a one-off special conversion made for the film using a 4 wheel drive Canadian Military Pattern chassis. The standard 2WD K2 would not have been capable of some of the film "stunts".

Three Austin K2/Y ambulances participated in the VE-VJ days 50th anniversary parade down the Mall in London on 19 August 1995.

Gallery

Exterior and interior

In action
The photographs below show that the Austin K2/Y ambulance was used in many parts of the world during whole WW II and beyond.

See also
 History of the ambulance
 Dodge WC54

References

External links

Wounded airmen are taken to an Austin K2/Y ambulance (1943).
Austin K2/Y war ambulance arriving at emergency services day 2014.
Vintage Austin K2/Y ambulance walk around (2014).
Austin K2/Y Ambulance at armyvehicles.dk.
Ice Cold in Alex Austin K2/Y at the Internet Movie Cars Database.
Movies and TV-series where Austin K2/Y appears at the Internet Movie Cars Database.

Military trucks of the United Kingdom
World War II vehicles of the United Kingdom
Off-road vehicles
Soft-skinned vehicles
K2 Y
Military ambulances
Military vehicles introduced in the 1930s